Alfons Bach (1904–1999) was a German industrial designer and watercolor painter. He is known for his architectural design projects and his tubular steel furniture, which have been described as "icons for their period."

Early life and career

Alfons Bach was born in Magdeburg, Germany. He grew up in Munich. He attended school in Berlin. He moved to New York, New York in 1926. Before his move, he had studied film and design.

Career

Bach designed the remodeling of Sach's and the Seneca Textile Building, both in New York City. His work was exhibited in early contemporary industrial art shows at the Metropolitan Museum of Art. In 1938 he designed his own home in Stamford, Connecticut. He led the project to build the Ridgeway Center, one of the first shopping malls in the United States. Bach designed tubular steel furniture in the 1930s for the Lloyd Manufacturing Company. They continued to produce his pieces until 1947. These tubular pieces are considered a link between Bauhaus and modern design style. He moved to Florida in 1959. He designed the Palm Trail Plaza and Palm Trail Yacht Club in Delray Beach. He curated the United States exhibition at the International Industrial Design Exhibition in 1969. He designed work for General Electric, Keystone Silver, Pacific Mills and Bigelow-Samford. He served as president of the American Designers Institute.

Later life and death

In 1992, he moved to Pensacola, Florida where he died in a nursing home, in August 1999.

Legacy

His work is held in the collection of the Cooper-Hewitt, National Design Museum and the Yale University Art Gallery. A set of 17th-century sliding-door panels from a Zen temple in Kyoto, Japan, owned by Bach and his wife, Anita, reside in the collection of the Metropolitan Museum of Art.

References

1904 births
1999 deaths
German industrial designers
German watercolourists
Artists from Magdeburg
People from Pensacola, Florida
20th-century German painters
20th-century German male artists
German male painters
Mid-century modern
Date of birth missing
Date of death missing